Nexperia is a semiconductor manufacturer headquartered in Nijmegen, the Netherlands. It is a subsidiary of the partially state-owned Chinese company Wingtech Technology. It has front-end factories in Hamburg, Germany, Greater Manchester, England, and Newport, Wales. It is the former Standard Products business unit of NXP Semiconductors (previously Philips Semiconductors). The company's product range includes bipolar transistors, diodes, ESD protection, TVS diodes, MOSFETs, and logic devices.

History
On June 14, 2016, NXP Semiconductors announced an agreement to divest its Standard Products business to a consortium of Chinese financial investors consisting of Beijing Jianguang Asset Management Co., Ltd ("JAC Capital"), a subsidiary of a Chinese state-owned investment company, and Wise Road Capital LTD ("Wise Road Capital"). Following the official transaction on February 6, 2017, Nexperia became an independent company, and the entire scope of the NXP Standard Products business, including its management team, and approximately 11,000 NXP employees were transferred from NXP to Nexperia. 

On October 25, 2018, Nexperia was acquired by Wingtech Technology, a partially state-owned Chinese ODM for smartphone companies for $3.6 billion.

In 2021, the company purchased the Inmos microprocessor factory in Newport, Wales. On 17 November 2022, the British government ordered Nexperia to divest 86% of its ownership interest in the Newport facility for national security reasons. Nexperia subsequently engaged New York law firm, Akin Gump to act on their behalf in their application for a judicial review of the UK government's divestment decision.

In November 2022, Nexperia acquired the Delft-based manufacturer of power management integrated circuits, Nowi.

In January 2023, Dutch public broadcaster Nederlandse Omroep Stichting reported that Nexperia chips ended up in Russian military kit despite international sanctions during the 2022 Russian invasion of Ukraine. Nexperia transceivers were discovered in a Russian Kh-101 missile, according to the Royal United Services Institute.

References

External links 

NXP Semiconductors
Philips
Semiconductor companies of the Netherlands
Government-owned companies of China